Indrajal Comics was a comic book series in India launched by the publisher of The Times of India, Bennet, Coleman & Co in March 1964. The first 32 issues contained Lee Falk's The Phantom stories, but thereafter, the title alternated between various King Features characters, including Lee Falk's Mandrake, Alex Raymond's Flash Gordon, Rip Kirby and Phil Corrigan, Roy Crane's Buz Sawyer, Allen Saunders' Mike Nomad, Kerry Drake, and Steve Dowling's Garth. Later in December 1976, it also published Bahadur, an Indian comic hero created by Aabid Surti.

Publication History
Back in the 1960s, when The Phantom comic strip by Lee Falk grew very popular in India, Anant Pai and others in Indrajal Comics collected them and published it as a comic book.

Indrajal Comics commenced with a monthly schedule. The first 10 issues devoted 16 pages to The Phantom, so many of the stories were edited to fit this format. Twelve pages were devoted to general knowledge (Gold Key style) and other stuff. The next 19 issues were 20-24 pages. Beginning with issue #29, Indrajal standardised on the conventional 32 page format. The series switched to fortnightly publication from #35 on 1 Jan 1967 (released on the 1st and 15th of each month). Mandrake made his first of many appearances in #46 (15 Jul 1967). Indrajal Comics changed to a weekly schedule from #385 on November 1–7, 1981 (The Embers of Fury, Part I). This issue featured "The Phantom" once again.Starting with #789 on 20 Aug 1989 (Vol 26 No 33), the series once again returned to a fortnightly schedule with 36 pages each.

In 1981, yearly subscriptions could be purchased for rupees 64. Each issue was individually numbered until 2 Jan 1983 when the editors decided to use a volume and number typical of periodical publications. Hence, #444 was identified as Vol. 20 No. 1 and so forth. The front cover design was also changed, with the introduction of the distinctive Indrajal Comics banner.

The cover artwork for the first 50 or so issues of Indrajal Comics was done by B.Govind, with the back cover featuring a pin-up poster. Govind's painted covers are highly regarded amongst Indian Phantom fans, and are on par with those of George Wilson for the Gold Key series and the Avon novels from the USA. The Indrajal Comics were a full-colour production from #8 onwards, with The Phantom's costume being coloured blue for the first 10 issues in the series, but thereafter the colour was changed to the more traditional purple. Several of the covers (e.g. #1, #9, #10 and #13) even dared to show The Phantom's eyes.

Names of some places and people were changed while publishing some stories from The Phantom, for example, Bengali was changed to Denkali to avoid confusion to Indian readers, the "Singh Brotherhood" were known as "Singa" pirates, etc.

The western comics that were reprinted in Indrajal were heavily censored. For example, scenes where The Phantom innocuously kissed his girlfriend Diana Palmer, were removed.

A total of 803 Indrajal Comics were published, excluding #123 and #124 which were not printed due to industrial strike action. More than half of these issues contained Phantom stories.

Indrajal goes regional
The regional version came in Bengali from January,1966 and the Indrajal #23 was #1 in Bengali - A Search for "Indrajal" Returns the registered publications for different languages (Marathi, Hindi, English, Bengali, Malayalam, Kannada, Gujarati and Tamil). 
A little trivia on how Indrajal Comics were introduced in the various languages prior the Bengali version, which was introduced on the 3rd year of Ijc, on Jan'66, and was 6th in the line....:

(I)Only English,Hindi & Marathi versions were introduced from the very beginning i.e. from #1(Mar'64).So the first 10 issues were published only in these 3 languages.

(II)Gujarati & Tamil versions were introduced on the next year(Jan'65) i.e. #11 in the original series was  #1 in these 2 languages and hence this issue(#23:Scarlet Sorceress) was actually #13 in Gujarati & Tamil..]

History of the Back-up Features
In addition to the main story, the books had various newspaper humour strips, short stories & general knowledge snippets as the back-up features. The most notable ones were "Henry", "Chimpoo", "Kittu", "Chalky", "The Little King", "No Comment", "Timpa", "Capree(animal world)", "Ancient World History", "Ripley's Believe It or Not" and many more. Advertising pages were reserved in all of the published issues, featured classic Indian brands like "Parle," BSA," Nutramul", "Gold-spot", "Gems", "Poppins", "Kissan" etc.

Painful End
Starting with #789 on 20 Aug 1989 (Vol 26 No 33), the series briefly returned to a fortnightly schedule with 36 pages each, before the publishers decided to cancel the series in their 27th year of production. The last issue was #805, published on 16 Apr 1990 (Vol 27 No 8:Dara:The Jaws of Treachery).

List of comics

Notes

External links
 
 
Indrajal Comics Investment or Collector's Pride 
The Deep Woods - fan site with Indrajal Comics reference section; (not updating anymore since April 2007)

Indian comics titles
1964 comics debuts